Astara is a city in and the capital of the Astara District of Azerbaijan.  Astara is a short walk across the border from Astara, Iran.

Geography

Climate
Astara has a borderline humid subtropical climate (Köppen climate classification: Cfa) and a hot-summer mediterranean climate (Köppen climate classification: Csa). Astara has cool, wet winters and very warm, highly humid summers, nevertheless with lower precipitation. The annual precipitation of the city, however, is one of the highest in Azerbaijan.

Attractions

Caspian Sea 

The Caspian Sea is the world's largest inland body of water, variously classed as the world's largest lake or a full-fledged sea. It is an endorheic basin (a basin without outflows) located between Europe and Asia, to the east of the Caucasus Mountains and to the west of the broad steppe of Central Asia. The sea has a surface area of 371,000 km2 (143,200 sq mi) (excluding the detached lagoon of Garabogazköl) and a volume of 78,200 km3 (18,800 cu mi). It has a salinity of approximately 1.2% (12 g/L), about a third of the salinity of most seawater.

Astara TV Tower 

As the demand for television broadcasting and telecommunication rises during the early 1980s, the Astara TV Tower was built. The television tower was uniquely designed, as its pinnacle is guyed to a horizontal cross-like steel structure.

Economy
Located next to the Iranian border, Astara attracts numerous visitors from Iran, going to Azerbaijan to purchase goods and services that may not be as readily available in Iran.

Transport 
Astara is currently served by a broad gauge railway only headed north.  A standard gauge connection to the Iranian railway network along the shore of the Caspian Sea is planned.  This break of gauge station is likely to be equipped with bogie exchange and SUW 2000 variable gauge axle track gauge changing facility.

Notable people 
 Kazim Azimov (born 1951), Azerbaijani historian of philosophy, culture, sociologist, Orientalist
 Ziya Bunyadov (1923–1997), Azerbaijani historian and World War II veteran

See also 
 Lankaran
 Lankaran International Airport
 Bay of Baku
 Astara, Iran

Notes

References 
 
 World Gazetteer: Azerbaijan – World-Gazetteer.com

Populated places in Astara District
Azerbaijan–Iran border crossings
Port cities in Azerbaijan
Divided cities